Archie Mark Procter (born 13 November 2001) is an English footballer who plays as a defender for Dorking Wanderers.

Career

AFC Wimbledon
Procter made his debut for AFC Wimbledon on 1 September 2020 in the EFL Trophy, coming on as a 62' minute substitute against Charlton Athletic.

On 16 February 2021, Procter joined National League South side Maidstone United on loan for the remainder of the 2020-21 season.

Accrington Stanley
On 1 July 2021, Procter signed for League One side Accrington Stanley for an undisclosed fee, signing a two-year contract.

Dorking Wanderers
On 4 November 2022, Proctor signed for Dorking Wanderers.

Personal life
Procter is the cousin of former midfielder Andrew Procter, who most notably played for Accrington Stanley.

Career statistics

Club

References

External links
Archie Procter at Aylesbury United

2001 births
Living people
English footballers
Association football defenders
AFC Wimbledon players
Metropolitan Police F.C. players
Carshalton Athletic F.C. players
Maidstone United F.C. players
Accrington Stanley F.C. players
Dorking Wanderers F.C. players
National League (English football) players
Southern Football League players